Chapter One is the first album by project Level 10 featuring Symphony X and Adrenaline Mob vocalist Russell Allen and bassist/producer Mat Sinner. It was released via Frontiers Records on January 23, 2015 with Cry No More single lyric video and it was anticipated by single Blasphemy on December 15, 2014.

The lineup is completed by drummer Randy Black and guitar players Alex Beyrodt of Primal Fear, Roland Grapow of Masterplan and Alessandro Del Vecchio (Hardline, Jorn, Edge of Forever) on keyboards.

The album also features songs from Amanda Somerville, Carsten Schulz, Magnus Karlsson and Sander Gommans.

Track listing
All songs written by Russell Allen, Alex Beyrodt, Sander Gommans, Magnus Karlsson, Carsten Schulz, Mat Sinner, Amanda Somerville and Alessandro Del Vecchio.

Personnel

Russell Allen - vocals
Mat Sinner - bass guitar, backing vocals, producing

Musicians
Alex Beyrodt - guitars
Roland Grapow - guitars
Alessandro Del Vecchio - keyboards
Randy Black - drums, percussion

Additional personnel
Sander Gommans - guitar on track 5
Carsten Schulz - backing vocals on tracks 8
Magnus Karlsson - acoustic guitar on track 9
Serafino Perugino - executive producer
Achim Köhler - recording, mixing and mastering

References

2015 albums
Frontiers Records albums